Martin Husár (born 1 February 1985) is a Slovak footballer who plays for FC Neded as a defender.

External links
 
 

1985 births
Living people
Sportspeople from Trnava
Slovak footballers
Slovak expatriate footballers
FC Spartak Trnava players
Lillestrøm SK players
Hamarkameratene players
Czech First League players
FC Zbrojovka Brno players
FC ViOn Zlaté Moravce players
FC Nitra players
1. FK Příbram players
Slovak Super Liga players
Eliteserien players
Expatriate footballers in Norway
Expatriate footballers in the Czech Republic
Association football fullbacks